Paiwarria venulius is a species of butterfly of the family Lycaenidae. It is found in Suriname, Colombia, and Southern Brazil.

References

Butterflies described in 1779
Theclinae
Lycaenidae of South America
Taxa named by Pieter Cramer